Phtheochroa ochralana is a species of moth of the family Tortricidae. It is found in Tunisia and on Malta.

References

Moths described in 1915
Phtheochroa